John Skinner (by 1486 – 1543?) of Reigate, Surrey, was an English politician.

He was a Member (MP) of the Parliament of England for Reigate in 1529.

References

15th-century births
1543 deaths
Year of birth unknown
Year of death uncertain
English MPs 1529–1536
People from Surrey